Vladimir Yuryevich Zubarev (born 5 January 1993) is a Russian football player who plays as a defensive midfielder.

Club career
He made his debut in the Russian Professional Football League for FC Spartak-2 Moscow on 16 July 2013 in a game against FC Dynamo Bryansk.

On 1 December 2018, he was released from his FC Ufa contract by mutual consent.

Career statistics

Club

References

External links

1993 births
Sportspeople from Volgograd
Living people
Russian footballers
Russia youth international footballers
Russia under-21 international footballers
Association football midfielders
Russian expatriate footballers
Expatriate footballers in Belarus
FC Ufa players
Russian Premier League players
FC Spartak Moscow players
FC Khimki players
FC Smorgon players
FC Spartak-2 Moscow players